Purpurcapsula is a genus of small sea snails, marine gastropod mollusks in the family Triviidae, the false cowries or trivias.

Species
Species within the genus Purpurcapsula include:
Purpurcapsula bayeri (Fehse, 1998)
Purpurcapsula corinneae (Shaw, 1909)
 Purpurcapsula erythrostigma Fehse, 2017
Purpurcapsula exigua (Gray, 1831)
 Purpurcapsula incisura Fehse, 2017
 Purpurcapsula laurae Fehse, 2015
 Purpurcapsula polynesiae (C. N. Cate, 1979)
 Purpurcapsula pulcherrima Fehse, 2017
Purpurcapsula rubramaculosa (Fehse & Grego, 2002)
Purpurcapsula zzyzyxia (Cate, 1979)

References

 Fehse D. & Grego J. (2009) Contributions to the knowledge of the Triviidae (Mollusca: Gastropoda). X. The Triviidae from the Red Sea with a description of a new genus Purpurcapsula and a new species in the genus Trivirostra Jousseaume, 1884. Visaya 2(5): 18-79, pls. 1-13. 
Contributions to the knowledge of Triviidae, 29-F. New Triviidae from the Marquesas. Visaya 5: 113-130, sér. Suppl

Triviidae